Acacia Park Cemetery is located in Norwood Park Township, Cook County, Illinois, just outside Chicago. To its south, across Irving Park Road, is Irving Park Cemetery. On the north side, Acacia Park adjoins Westlawn Cemetery; the gates in the fence dividing Acacia Park and Westlawn are usually open, allowing visitors to pass freely between them.

Notable burials
 Johannes Anderson (1887–1950), World War I Congressional Medal of Honor recipient
 Ral Donner (1943–1984), singer
 Red Faber (1888–1976), baseball player
 Irna Phillips (1901–1973), television producer
 Alvah Curtis Roebuck (1864–1948), co-founder of Sears.
 Mike Royko (1932–1997), columnist
 Mae Doelling Schmidt (1888–1965), pianist, composer, music educator

References

Cemeteries in Chicago
1922 establishments in Illinois